Clube Desportivo da Huíla is an Angolan football club based in Lubango, Huila. The club is attached to the Angolan Armed Forces and has close ties with Primeiro de Agosto. In the 2011–12 season of the Angolan second division, the club got promoted to the Girabola. They play their home games at the Estádio do Ferroviário da Huíla. On 17 April 2006 Agostinho Tramagal was appointed as their new coach.

On 2 April 2012, Mário Francisco Soares Lopes was presented this Monday in Lubango city, southern Huíla province, as the new coach of the second division soccer team of Desportivo da Huíla. The new coach replaces Joaquim Finda "Mozer", who managed the team over the last two years.

Achievements
Angolan League:
Winner 0:
 Runner Up (0) :
Angola Cup:
Winner 0:
 Runner Up (3) : 2002, 2013, 2019.
Angola Super Cup:
Winner 0:
 Runner Up (0) :
Gira Angola:
Winner (1): 2004.
 Runner Up (0) :

Recent seasons
C.D. Huíla's season-by-season performance since 2011:

 PR = Preliminary round, 1R = First round, GS = Group stage, R32 = Round of 32, R16 = Round of 16, QF = Quarter-finals, SF = Semi-finals

League and cup positions

Performance in CAF competitions
CAF Confederation Cup: 1 appearance
2014 – First Round

Players and staff

Players

Squad

Staff

Manager history and performance

See also
 Desportivo da Huíla Basketball
 Girabola (2016)
 Gira Angola

References

External links
 Girabola.com profile
 Zerozero.pt profile
 Sapo.pt profile
 Facebook profile

Desportivo Huila
Lubango
Association football clubs established in 1955
1955 establishments in Angola
Desportivo Huila